Claudia Kriz (born 18 January 1957) is a German archer. She competed in the women's individual and team events at the 1988 Summer Olympics.

References

External links
 

1957 births
Living people
German female archers
Olympic archers of West Germany
Archers at the 1988 Summer Olympics
People from Bergstraße (district)
Sportspeople from Darmstadt (region)
20th-century German women